Koeleria is a common and widespread genus of plants in the grass family, found on all continents except Antarctica and on various oceanic islands. It includes species known generally as Junegrasses.

The genus was named after German botanist Georg Ludwig Koeler (1765–1807).

Species

Koeleria altaica – Siberia, China, Kazakhstan, Mongolia
Koeleria argentea – China, Mongolia, Central Asia, Afghanistan, Pakistan, Himalayas
Koeleria asiatica – Russia, China incl Tibet, Mongolia, Alaska, Yukon, Northwest Territories
Koeleria askoldensis – Primorye region of Russia incl Askold Island
Koeleria besseri – Europe from the Czech Republic to central European Russia
Koeleria biebersteinii – Crimea
Koeleria boliviensis – Bolivia
Koeleria brevis – Ukraine, Russia, Caucasus, Turkey
Koeleria calderonii – Argentina (Mendoza)
Koeleria capensis – Yemen, Africa from Ethiopia + Cameroon to Cape Province
Koeleria carolii – Morocco
Koeleria caudata – Spain, Portugal, Morocco, Algeria
Koeleria cenisia – western Alps (France, Italy, Switzerland)
Koeleria cheesemanii – New Zealand
Koeleria crassipes – Spain, Portugal
Koeleria delavignei – Russia, Ukraine, Belarus, Kazakhstan
Koeleria embergeri – Morocco
Koeleria eriostachya – Eurasia from Switzerland to Kazakhstan
Koeleria fueguina – Chile, Argentina
Koeleria glauca – Eurasia from France to Mongolia
Koeleria gubanovii – Amur Oblast in Russia
Koeleria hirsuta – central Alps (Italy, Switzerland, Austria)
Koeleria × hungarica – Czech Republic, Romania, Bulgaria
Koeleria inaequaliglumis – Argentina (Mendoza)
Koeleria insubrica – Italy, Croatia
Koeleria karavajevii – Yakutia
Koeleria kurtzii – Chile, Argentina, Bolivia, Peru
Koeleria loweana – Madeira
Koeleria lucana – Basilicata region of Italy
Koeleria luerssenii – Caucasus
Koeleria macrantha – Eurasia, North America
Koeleria mendocinensis – Argentina
Koeleria micrathera – Argentina, Chile incl Juan Fernández Is
Koeleria × mixta – Great Britain
Koeleria nitidula – Balkans, Turkey, Syria, Iran, Caucasus, Afghanistan
Koeleria novozelandica – New Zealand
Koeleria permollis – Falkland Is, Argentina, Chile, Uruguay, Bolivia, Peru
Koeleria praeandina – Argentina (Mendoza)
Koeleria pyramidata – Eurasia from France + Denmark to Nepal + Yakutia
Koeleria rhodopea – Bulgaria
Koeleria riguorum – New Zealand South I
Koeleria skrjabinii – Yakutia
Koeleria splendens – Mediterranean from Spain + Morocco to Turkey
Koeleria thonii – Irkutsk, Krasnoyarsk
Koeleria tzvelevii – Zabaykalsky Krai
Koeleria vallesiana – Europe, North Africa
Koeleria ventanicola – Argentina (Buenos Aires)
Koeleria vurilochensis – Argentina (Chubut, Neuquén, Río Negro, Santa Cruz)

Formerly included
hundreds of species once included in Koeleria but now considered better suited to other genera including Aeluropus, Agrostis, Colpodium, Dactylis, Erioneuron, Festuca, Graphephorum, Rostraria, Schismus, Sesleria, Trisetaria and Trisetum.

References

Pooideae
Poaceae genera
Grasses of Africa
Grasses of Asia
Grasses of Europe
Grasses of North America
Grasses of Oceania
Grasses of South America